The Patrick White Award is an annual literary prize established by Patrick White. White used his 1973 Nobel Prize in Literature award to establish a trust for this prize.

The $25,000 cash award is given to a writer who has been highly creative over a long period but has not necessarily received adequate recognition. White stipulated that the award be announced the Friday after the Melbourne Cup to turn attention from sport to literature. The 2010 award was reduced to $18,000 because of the economic slump, and in 2012 it was $23,000. In 2020 the winner received $15,000. Writers are automatically eligible without the necessity for submissions.

Winners
 2022 Antigone Kefala
 2021 Adam Aitken
2020 Gregory Day
2019 Jordie Albiston
 2018 Samuel Wagan Watson
2017 Tony Birch
 2016 Carmel Bird
 2015 Joan London
 2014 Brian Castro
 2013 Louis Nowra
 2012 Amanda Lohrey
2011 Robert Adamson
2010 David Foster
2009 Beverley Farmer
2008 John Romeril
2007 David Rowbotham
2006 Morris Lurie
2005 Fay Zwicky
2004 Nancy Phelan
2003 Janette Turner Hospital
2002 Tom Hungerford
2001 Geoff Page
2000 Thomas Shapcott
1999 Gerald Murnane
1998 Alma De Groen
1997 Vivian Smith
1996 Elizabeth Harrower
1995 Elizabeth Riddell
1994 Dimitris Tsaloumas
1993 Amy Witting
1992 Peter Cowan
1991 David Martin
1990 Robert Gray
1989 Thea Astley
1988 Roland Robinson
1987 William Hart-Smith
1986 John Morrison
1985 Judah Waten (posthumous)
1984 Rosemary Dobson
1983 Marjorie Barnard
1982 Bruce Beaver
1981 Dal Stivens
1980 Bruce Dawe
1979 Randolph Stow
1978 Gwen Harwood
1977 Sumner Locke Elliott
1976 John Blight
1975 David Campbell
1974 Christina Stead

References

Australian literary awards
Awards established in 1974
1974 establishments in Australia